

The Higher Education Authority (HEA), officially An tÚdarás um Ard-Oideachas, is the statutory body providing policy advice for higher education in Ireland.

Description and functions
The HEA was established under the Higher Education Authority Act 1971. Its official Irish language name is  An tÚdarás um Ard-Oideachas. The HEA has a statutory responsibility for the effective governance of higher education in Ireland. It provides policy advice to the Irish Government across various aspects of the mission of higher education. According to their website, the aim of the HEA is "to create a coherent system of diverse institutions with distinct missions, which is responsive to the social, cultural and economic development of Ireland and its people and supports the achievement of national objectives".
 
The authority has a statutory responsibility, at central government level, for the governance and regulation of higher education institutions and the higher education system. The authority is responsible for the funding of Irish universities, institutes of technology and other third level colleges.

The HEA was responsible for administering the Programme for Research in Third Level Institutions (PRTLI), which provided funding for research from 1998 to around 2018.

Governance 
 the Chief Executive is Alan Wall.  The Chairperson of the Authority is Michael Horgan.

New governing act
, the Higher Education Authority Bill 2022 has passed through Dáil Éireann and is being debated in Seanad Éireann. The new legislation is intended to repeal and replace the Higher Education Authority Act 1971, and amend a number of other laws.

See also 
 Education in the Republic of Ireland
 List of universities in the Republic of Ireland
 Irish Research Council

References

External links

Educational organisations based in the Republic of Ireland
Higher education authorities
Regulation in Ireland
Department of Further and Higher Education, Research, Innovation and Science